The coal mining communities, or coal towns  of Raleigh County, West Virginia were situated to exploit the area's rich coal seams. Many of these towns were located in deep ravines that afforded direct access to the coal through the hillsides, allowing mined coal to be dropped or conveyed downhill to railway lines at the valley floor. Many of these encampments were set up as coal towns, and when their mines closed, the towns vanished.  Raleigh County covers portions of three coalfields: the New River Coalfield, the Winding Gulf Coalfield and the Coal River Coalfield. Below is partial listing of known coal towns. Further listings are available here

New River Coalfield

 Cranberry
 Mabscott
 Oswald (abandoned)
 Price Hill
 Raleigh
 Royal (abandoned)
 Skelton
 Sprague
 Stanaford
 Stonewall (abandoned)
 Tamroy (abandoned)
 Terry
 Wickham
 Wright (abandoned)

Winding Gulf Coalfield

 Abney
 Affinity 
 Amigo
 Battleship (abandoned)
 Besoco
 Big Stick (abandoned)
 Coal City
 Crab Orchard
 East Gulf
 Eccles
 Fireco
 Glen White
 Helen
 Hot Coal (abandoned)
 Killarney (abandoned)
 Lego
 Lester
 Lillybrook (abandoned)
 Lynwinn (abandoned)
 McAlpin (abandoned)
 Mead
 Metalton (abandoned)
 Pemberton (abandoned)
 Pickshin (abandoned)
 Rhodell
 Royal (abandoned)
 Slab Fork
 Sophia
 Stonecoal Junction
 Stotesbury
 Sullivan
 Tams (abandoned)
 Terry
 Viacovia (abandoned)
 Whitby
 Willibet (abandoned)
 Winding Gulf
 Woodbay (abandoned)

Coal River Coalfield

 Ameagle
 Birchton
 Dorothy
 Edwight (abandoned)
 Eunice
 Marfork (abandoned)
 Montcoal
 Stickney

References

.
New River Coalfield
Winding Gulf Coalfield
Geography of Raleigh County, West Virginia
Ghost towns in West Virginia